Étienne Proux (19 April 1897 – 24 April 1983) was a French triple jumper. He competed at the 1920 Summer Olympics and finished 16th.

References

External links 
 

1897 births
1983 deaths
French male triple jumpers
Athletes (track and field) at the 1920 Summer Olympics
Olympic athletes of France